Chevrolet Corvette ZR-1 may refer to:

 Chevrolet Corvette C3 ZR-1 (produced 1970–1972)
 Chevrolet Corvette C4 ZR-1 (produced 1990–1995)
 Chevrolet Corvette C6 ZR1 (produced 2009–2013)
 Chevrolet Corvette C7 ZR1 (called a 2019 model, produced from 2018 onwards)